Léon Lauvray (24 September 1877 – 4 June 1965) was a French politician. He served as a member of the Chamber of Deputies from 1928 to 1932 and the Senate from 1938 to 1945, representing Eure.

References

1877 births
1965 deaths
People from Évreux
Politicians from Normandy
Democratic and Social Action politicians
Members of the 14th Chamber of Deputies of the French Third Republic
French Senators of the Third Republic